Gwendolyn "Gwen" Tennyson, occasionally known as Lucky Girl, is a fictional character that appears in the Ben 10 franchise. The paternal first cousin and best friend of title protagonist Ben Tennyson, Gwen is a core member of Ben’s team who frequently aids him in his various adventures. A highly intelligent and a skilled martial artist, Gwen later develops magic abilities that are eventually revealed to be alien in nature, having inherited it from her alien paternal grandmother, Verdona.

Gwen was created for Ben 10 (2005–2008), in which she was voiced as a 10-year-old by Meagan Smith, with Tara Strong voicing her future version. Smith was replaced by Ashley Johnson, who voiced the teenage Gwen for the sequel series Ben 10: Alien Force (2008–2010), Ben 10: Ultimate Alien (2010–2012), and Ben 10: Omniverse (2012–2014), while Montserrat Hernandez voiced Gwen for the reboot series Ben 10 (2016–2021). An anime spin-off solo series starring Gwen, set in the original continuity as she attends college, is in active development.

Fictional character biography

Ben 10 (2005–2008) 

In the series, Gwen Tennyson (Meagan Smith) is sent by her parents on a road trip with her Grandpa Max (Paul Eiding) and her cousin Ben (Tara Strong). She and Ben constantly argue, however they are both shown to deeply care for each other on various occasions throughout the series. Following Ben's acquisition of the Omnitrix, the trio embark in a series of adventures, encountering various extraterrestrial and supernatural entities, including master magician Hex (Khary Payton) and his niece Charmcaster (Kari Wahlgren), the latter of whom detects a "magical aura" within Gwen, which she begins tapping into, acquiring magical powers of her own, after learning she would from a future version of herself (Tara Strong), after procuring a small book of spells from Charmcaster in the episode "A Change of Face". On two occasions, Gwen uses artifacts sought by the master magicians known as the Charms of Bezel to acquire incredible and unique powers and abilities to become a superhero by the name of "Lucky Girl". Besides magic, Gwen's biggest power is her intelligence: she is a computer expert and revealed to have extensive knowledge of History (episode "Hunted") and Science (episodes "Tourist Trap" and "Monster Weather"). She is also a skilled martial arts practitioner and adept gymnast.

Ben 10: Alien Force (2008–2010) 

Set five years after the end of the original series, Gwen Tennyson (Ashley Johnson) is now a black belt in karate, but tends to favor using her powers. She is capable of creating energy constructs for nearly any purpose, usually creating platforms to levitate herself (and others), beams to grab enemies, circular blasts to knock enemies back, projecting beams from her eyes that seem to simulate heat vision, and opening up interdimensional portals, which she uses to assist her cousin Ben (Yuri Lowenthal) after the disappearance of their grandfather forces him to put back on the Omnitrix. In the episode "Everybody Talks About the Weather", the pair's former enemy Kevin (Greg Cipes) tells Gwen her powers and abilities originate from her "alien bloodline", which she refuses to believe. In "What Are Little Girls Made Of?", Gwen discovers this to be true, that her paternal grandmother, Verdona, is an energy being known as an Anodite; a magic-wielding race made of mana, a substance of magic, from the distant planet Anodyne, and that Gwen seems to be the only human descendant of her to have inherited her powers. Verdona offers to take Gwen to her home planet and train her in the immense mystical and magical ways of the Anodites, but Gwen prefers to remain on Earth with Ben and Kevin, later coming into conflict with a returned Charmcaster and Michael Morningstar, who after initially seeking to absorb her powers, seeks revenge against her after her taking back her powers reduced him to a husk which he dubbed "Darkstar". Gwen later unleashes her true Anodite form for the first time in "War of the Worlds: Part 2", succeeding defending the world from the Highbreed. During the course of the series, she develops a romantic relationship with Kevin, and is revealed to suffer from both arachnophobia and claustrophobia. Galadriel Stineman portrays Gwen in the 2009 superhero television film Ben 10: Alien Swarm.

Ben 10: Ultimate Alien (2010–2012) 

Set several weeks after the previous series, Gwen Tennyson, now sixteen years old, releases her dormant, inner Anodite for the second time against Zombozo (John DiMaggio) after he attempts to kill her aunt and Ben's mother Sandra (Beth Littleford), growing to a gigantic size and shouting at him to leave the Tennyson family, as well as Kevin's family, alone, terrifying him before letting him go to spread the word to all of their other enemies. Gwen also discovers her black-haired near-identical cousin Sunny (also voiced by Ashley Johnson) is also an Anodite and once again encounters Charmcaster and Darkstar, the pair now engaged in a romantic relationship after Charmcaster failed to use the Great One Dagon to resurrect her father, before helping Ben save the universe in destroying Dagon and his Esoterica. Ben 10/Generator Rex: Heroes United, a one-hour crossover with fellow Man of Action series Generator Rex, aired on November 25, 2011 on Cartoon Network, in which Gwen is featured towards the beginning and in a flashback in a cameo appearance.

Ben 10: Omniverse (2012–2014) 

Unlike in previous series, sixteen-year-old Gwen is a supporting character in the modern day, only popping up occasionally to assist Ben due to now attending college. She is often depicted in flashback sequences to when she was 11-years-old, revealing she had developed a crush on Kevin at that time. Immediately after the previous series, Gwen is seen with Ben and Kevin chasing Zombozo through Bellwood. Shortly after fighting and capturing Zombozo, Gwen says her goodbyes to Ben because she is heading to college since she took honor classes. She then tells Ben to stay out of trouble and gets into the car with Kevin (who also reveals that he will be staying with Gwen, but near campus), and the two drive off, leaving Ben to deal with Zombozo. Sometime later, she makes the decision to take up the mantle of Lucky Girl again, using a nonverbal glamour-spell to change her appearance. She is later shown to attend a magic class taught by a redeemed Hex, after he finally overcomes his depression, him having become her favorite teacher, before he is trapped as a stone totem by his niece Charmcaster. Later, after being freed, he and Gwen keep Charmcaster as a miniature stone totem under the hope that she can get better someday herself.

At the end of "A New Dawn", after watching the new universe be created, Ben calls Gwen to get Kevin as he proposes that the trio and his partner Rook Blonko (Bumper Robinson) go on a road trip together to explore the universe that they watched being created.

Ben 10 (2016–2021) 

Ben 10 introduces a re-imagined Gwen (in her 10-year-old form), her cousin Ben, and Grandpa Max, as they travel the country during summer vacation. When Ben finds the Omnitrix, a mysterious watch that transforms him into 10 different aliens, a world of extraterrestrial superpowers opens up to him; Gwen's form as Lucky Girl in the previous continuity exists as a popular pre-existing multimedia franchise of which she is a fan, while her enemy "Kevin 11" has a crush on Gwen, to which she is oblivious.

Spin-off solo series 
In September 2021, in response to fan questioning about rumours of a Gwen 10 spin-off series, Man of Action confirmed they were actively working with a Japanese anime company to develop a series that would "just follow Gwen without any Ben" as they attend college, retaining her boyfriend Kevin Levin as a supporting character, citing the character's greater popularity in Asia compared to Ben as the reason for the solo series entering development.

Concept and creation 

Ben 10 was created by Man of Action (consisting of comic book creators Duncan Rouleau, Joe Casey, Joe Kelly, and Steven T. Seagle) and was produced by Cartoon Network Studios. The group worked on the concept of Ben 10 and its title character roughly three years before Cartoon Network picked up the series. Dave Johnson also helped in the design development. Gwen was originally developed to be a classmate, best friend and potential romantic interest of Ben's accompanying on his road trip with his grandfather. Later in development, she was changed to be his cousin, the pair being exactly the same age.

Gwen's original design, including a yellow t-shirt and ponytail, was inspired by the original design of Ben Tennyson, the red hair retained for all series, while the ponytail would be incorporated into her outfit redesign by Glen Murakami for the last season of Alien Force, the entirety of Ultimate Alien and the first season of Omniverse. Her head and hair were reworked by Glenn Wong, who also gave the character her blue top in Alien Force, while colors were added by Chris Hooten.

The original concept behind the characters was later cited as the primary inspiration for the characters of Patrice Blazing and Nate Timely in PopCap Games and Dark Horse Comics' Plants vs. Zombies comic series, with Patrice designed after Gwen and Nate after Ben.

Personality
In the original series, Gwen is portrayed as an intelligent, mature but usually stubborn and smart-mouthed when it came to talking with Ben. Her quick thinking and good instincts give her an edge in dealing with dangerous situations.

As she got older, she became even more mature, caring, and sympathetic. Her affection towards her cousin Ben became more clear, as she had deeply bonded with him over that adventure-filled summer, realizing how much she cared about him. Gwen is willing to forgive villains for their wrongdoings, the most notable being Kevin, if she believes they have changed for the better.

Despite being far more mature and reasonable than Ben and Kevin, Gwen is somewhat hot-headed and can lose control of her abilities if angered enough.

Powers and abilities 
Due to her Anodite (beings of pure magical energy) heritage and having inherited "the spark", Gwen is able to manipulate mana (life energy/chakra/chi).

Magic
In the original series, Gwen has shown a latent knack for magic, able to handle multiple magical artifacts. In the third season, after keeping the villain Charmcaster’s small spellbook, Gwen begins casting spells and practicing magic. Throughout the Original Series, her abilities manifested as light blue energy, due to her being a badly trained Anodite as well as due to her manipulating mana indirectly. Despite abandoning these tactics in favor of her Anodite powers starting in Alien Force, she continued casting spells later on Ultimate Alien and Omniverse.

Mana manipulation
Starting in Alien Force, Gwen’s abilities have progressed to a magenta-colored energy. She soon discovers her Anodite heritage and comes to learn the energy she manipulates is mana, a life force energy present in all living beings. Mana is the basis of magic, which explains Gwen’s previous magical proficiency.

By manipulating mana, Gwen is able to create forcefields, energy blasts, beams, stepping stones and energy constructs. She is also able to track living beings by sensing their mana and can absorb or generate mana at will. Through her powers, she is also capable of telekinesis, teleportation, clairvoyance and healing.

Anodite form
Gwen is able to assume an Anodite form. In this form, she is dark purple in color, with long glowing pink/white hair. In this form, she is capable of growing in stature, flight, and immortality, as well as her abilities being enhanced exponentially.

Martial arts
Gwen is a skilled martial artist and has been practicing since the original series. She is trained in Karate and Jiu-jitsu. She is also a talented gymnast as she is very agile and can jump great distances.

Intellect
Gwen is highly intelligent and graduated high school early at 16.

Portrayal

Voice actors 
She is voiced by Meagan Smith in the 2005 original series as 10-year old Gwen to the show's finale in 2008. Smith reprises her role in 2012 in the film Ben 10: Destroy All Aliens.

In the 2008 sequel series, Ben 10: Alien Force; teenage Gwen (15 years old), is voiced by Ashley Johnson (replacing Smith) and continued to voice Gwen in both Ben 10: Ultimate Alien and Ben 10: Omniverse respectively. In Omniverse, she voices both the kid and teenage versions of Gwen, as well as all her alternate timeline counterparts.

Tara Strong voices Gwen as an adult from an alternate timeline in the original series for two episodes ("Ben 10,000" and "Ken 10").

Gwen is voiced by Montserrat Hernandez in the 2016 reboot, who additionally voices both alternate variants (from the future and a universe where she had the Omnitrix instead of Ben) and all alien forms she assumes.

Live-action 
Gwen is played by Haley Ramm in Ben 10: Race Against Time and by Galadriel Stineman in Ben 10: Alien Swarm.

See also 
 List of Ben 10 characters

References 

Ben 10
Child superheroes
Fictional alien hunters
Fictional extraterrestrial–human hybrids
Fictional characters with energy-manipulation abilities
Fictional characters who use magic
Fictional characters with dimensional travel abilities
Female characters in animated series
Fictional karateka
American superheroes
Child characters in animated television series
Teenage characters in television
Television characters introduced in 2005
Animated characters introduced in 2005
Female superheroes
Cartoon Network Studios superheroes
Characters created by Steven T. Seagle